William Forsyth (20 January 1891 – 1 July 1939) was a Canadian long-distance runner. He competed in the marathon at the 1912 Summer Olympics.

References

1891 births
1939 deaths
Athletes (track and field) at the 1912 Summer Olympics
Canadian male long-distance runners
Canadian male marathon runners
Olympic track and field athletes of Canada
Track and field athletes from Ontario